Saint Charles Reservoir is the name of three reservoirs in Pueblo County, Colorado.

Saint Charles Reservoir Number 2 and Saint Charles Reservoir Number 3 are located next to each other in Stem Beach, just south of Pueblo. Reservoirs number 2 and 3 were built by Colorado Fuel and Iron in the early 1900s. All three reservoirs are privately held and not open to the public.

References

Reservoirs in Colorado
Bodies of water of Pueblo County, Colorado